Rana Tanveer Hussain (born 1 October 1949) is a Pakistani politician who has been a member of the National Assembly of Pakistan since August 2018. Previously, he was a member of the National Assembly between 1985 and May 2018.

He served as Minister for Defence Production and Minister for Science and Technology, in Abbasi cabinet from 2017 to 2018. Previously he served as the Minister for Defence Production and the Minister for Science and Technology in the Third Sharif ministry. A leader of the Pakistan Muslim League (N), Hussain previously briefly held the cabinet portfolio of Minister for Defence Production during the Gillani ministry in 2008.

He has previously served as Parliamentary Secretary to Ministry of Finance, Special Assistant to the Prime Minister on Finance from 1997 to 1999 as well Parliamentary Secretary to the Prime Minister.

Early life and education
He was born on 1 October 1949 in Sheikhupura, Punjab.

He received degree of M.A. in Economics and LLB from the Punjab University, Lahore.

Political career
Hussain started his political career in 1983 when he became district member of the council in Sheikhupura. He was elected as member of the National Assembly of Pakistan for the first time in 1985 Pakistani general election as an independent candidate. He later joined Pakistan Muslim League. In 1990 Pakistani general elections, he was re-elected as member of the National Assembly for the second time.

In 1993 Pakistani general elections, he lost the seat of the National Assembly. In 1997 Pakistani general elections, he was re-elected as the member of the National Assembly for the third time. From 1997 to 1999, he served as Special Assistant to then Prime Minister of Pakistan Nawaz Sharif on Finance.

In 2008 Pakistani general elections, he was re-elected as the member of the National Assembly for the fourth time from two constituencies NA-131 and NA-132. He vacated NA-131 seat to retain NA-132.

In 2013 Pakistani general elections, he was re-elected as the member of the National Assembly for the fifth time. In June 2013, he was appointed as the Minister for Defence Production. Later he was given the additional portfolio of Minister for Science and Technology.

He had ceased to hold ministerial office in July 2017 when the federal cabinet was disbanded following the resignation of Prime Minister Nawaz Sharif after Panama Papers case decision. Following the election of Shahid Khaqan Abbasi as Prime Minister of Pakistan in August 2017, he was inducted into the federal cabinet of Abbasi. He was appointed as federal minister for Defence Production for third time. In November 2017, he was give the additional cabinet portfolio of Minister for Science and Technology after which Minister of State for Science and Technology, Mir Dostain Khan Domki stepped down in protest. On 3 May 2018, in a cabinet reshuffle, he ceased to hold the office as Federal Minister for Defence Production after Usman Ibrahim succeeded him. Upon the dissolution of the National Assembly on the expiration of its term on 31 May 2018, Hussain ceased to hold the office as Federal Minister for Science and Technology.

He was re-elected to the National Assembly as a candidate of PML-N from Constituency NA-120 (Sheikhupura-II) in 2018 Pakistani general election.

References 

|-

|-

Living people
1949 births
People from Sheikhupura District
Government College University, Lahore alumni
University of the Punjab alumni
Pakistan Muslim League (N) MNAs
Government ministers of Pakistan
Pakistani MNAs 1985–1988
Pakistani MNAs 1990–1993
Pakistani MNAs 1997–1999
Pakistani MNAs 2008–2013
Pakistani MNAs 2013–2018
Pakistani MNAs 2018–2023
Defence Production Ministers of Pakistan